The 2013–14 Slovenian Second League season began on 10 August 2013 and ended on 24 May 2014. Each team played a total of 27 matches.

Clubs

League table

Results

First and second round

Third round

See also
2013–14 Slovenian PrvaLiga
2013–14 Slovenian Third League

References

External links
Football Association of Slovenia 

Slovenian Second League seasons
2013–14 in Slovenian football
Sloveniae, 2013-14